Unfinished Revolution is a 1987 Irish folk music album by Christy Moore. The album was released the same year as the Remembrance Day bombing in Enniskillen, an event Moore described as changing his viewpoint on Irish Republicanism. The album title refers to Moore's long-time support of Irish unification.

Track listing 
All tracks composed by Christy Moore; except where indicated
 "Biko Drum" (Wally Page)
 "Natives" (Paul Doran)
 "Metropolitan Avenue" (Noel Brazil)
 "Unfinished Revolution" (Peter Cadle)
 "The Other Side"
 "Messenger Boy" (Christie Hennessy)
 "On The Bridge"
 "Suffocate" (Noel Brazil)
 "Derby Day" (Music: Paul Doran)
 "Dr. Vibes" (Declan Sinnott)
 "A Pair of Brown Eyes" (Shane MacGowan)

References

External links 
 Set list at Discogs

Christy Moore albums
1987 albums